2014 Regional League Division 2 Central & Eastern  Region is the 6th season of the League competition since its establishment in 2009. It is in the third tier of the Thai football league system.

Changes from Last Season

Team Changes

Promoted Clubs

No club was promoted to the Thai Division 1 League. Last years league champions Look Isan-Thai Airways and runners up Nakhon Nayok failed to qualify from the 2013 Regional League Division 2 championship pool.

Relegated Clubs

Rayong were relegated from the 2013 Thai Division 1 League

Relocated Clubs

J.W. Rangsit moved into the Regional League Bangkok Area Division 2014.

Renamed Clubs

 Pluak Daeng renamed TG Rayong.
 Look Isan-Thai Airways renamed Pakchong United.

Stadium and locations

League table

References

External links
 Football Association of Thailand

Regional League Central-East Division seasons